Ranchi Metro is a 16.2 km planned rapid transit system for the city of Ranchi in Jharkhand, India.
 It would be owned and operated by state run Jharkhand Metro Rail Corporation.

History
The Metro rail is expected to run on two routes. For First Phase – Routes 1A, 1B, – i.e. Ratu road via Kutcheri Chowk and Stadium to station Point 17 nearby HEC Ltd. In the second phase, Metro Rail services would be provided between Lakshmi Nagar to Namkum via Ranchi Main Road. 
The Two metro lines will have junction at nearby railway flyover and Ranchi main road junction.

Corridors

Option 1
Station Line 1
Ratu Road - 
Kutcheri Chowk - Stadium - Point 4 (Sarjana Chowk) - Point 5 - Point 6 - Point 7 (Sujata Chowk) -Point 8 (ROB Chowk)- Point 9 (Rajendra Chowk)- Point 10 (Vivekanand Chowk) - Point 11 - Point 12 - Point 13 (Hatia Railway Station Chowk) - Point 14 - Point 15 - Point 16 (Dhurwa golchakker Chowk) - Point 17 (Heavy Engineering Corporation Ltd.).
Stations Line 2
Point 1 - Point 10 - Point 11 - Point 12 - Point 13 -Point 14 - Point 15 - Point 16 - Point 17 - Point 18 - Point 19 - Point 20  (Namkum metro station).

Option 2
kokar -- lalpur -- main road -- ratu road

Option 3

Network Map

See also
 Urban rail transit in India

References

External links
 website

Proposed rapid transit in India
Transport in Ranchi
Standard gauge railways in India